Nicolae Vișan (born April 13, 1956 - died August 13, 2017) is a former Romanian ice hockey player. He played for the Romania men's national ice hockey team at the 1976 Winter Olympics in Innsbruck.

References

1953 births
Living people
Ice hockey players at the 1976 Winter Olympics
Olympic ice hockey players of Romania
Romanian ice hockey forwards